The UT Rio Grande Valley Vaqueros men's basketball statistical leaders are individual statistical leaders of the Texas–Rio Grande Valley Vaqueros men's basketball program in various categories, including points, three-pointers, assists, blocks, rebounds, and steals. Within those areas, the lists identify single-game, single-season, and career leaders. The Vaqueros represent the University of Texas Rio Grande Valley (UTRGV) in the NCAA Division I Western Athletic Conference.

UTRGV did not formally exist until 2013, and did not begin operation until 2015. The school was established by the merger of two campuses of the University of Texas System—the University of Texas at Brownsville (UTB) and University of Texas–Pan American (UTPA). Before the merger, UTB was a member of the National Association of Intercollegiate Athletics (NAIA), competing as the UT Brownsville Ocelots, while UTPA competed as the Texas–Pan American (or UT Pan American) Broncs in NCAA Division I. Before the merger took full effect, the UT System announced that the UTPA athletic program would transfer directly to UTRGV, with the new school thus fully inheriting UTPA's athletic history. In turn, this means that the history of UTRGV men's basketball officially begins with UTPA's first season of intercollegiate basketball in 1952–53 (when that school was known as Pan American College).  The NCAA did not officially record assists as a stat until the 1983–84 season, and blocks and steals until the 1985–86 season, but the UTRGV record books include players in these stats before these seasons. These lists are updated through the end of the 2020–21 season.

Scoring

Rebounds

Assists

Steals

Blocks

References

Lists of college basketball statistical leaders by team
Statistical
Statistical